The 2007 American Handball Women's Youth Championships took place in Cascavel from September 4 – 8. It acts as the Pan American qualifying tournament for the 2008 World Youth Women's Handball Championship.

Results

Final standing

References 
 brasilhandebol.com.br

2007 in handball
Pan American Women's Youth Handball Championship
2007 in youth sport